The Steph Show is an Australian reality television series starring singer and actress Stephanie McIntosh. The show premiered on Australian TV at 6pm 28 July 2006 on Network Ten. The show, in the same vein as The Ashlee Simpson Show, had cameras following McIntosh as she recorded her debut album Tightrope which was released on 9 September 2006. The first single "Mistake" was released the day after the season premiere. The theme song is "Tightrope" by Stephanie McIntosh. The last episode is to coincide with the release of "Tightrope".

The final show was aired on 15 September 2006. The finale included McIntosh shooting the music video for "Tightrope".

References

External links
 Stephanie McIntosh - Official site
 Stephanie Mcintosh Myspace - Official Myspace
 - Official Site

Network 10 original programming
2000s Australian reality television series
2006 Australian television series debuts
2006 Australian television series endings